Sona Glacier  is the Himalayan glacier situated in the eastern part of Uttarakhand in the Pithoragarh district of India.

Geography 
Sona Glacier is located at the base of five peaks of Panchachuli in the Lassar Yankti - Darma valley. With Meola Glacier it forms the famous Panchchuli Glacier as mixed glacial system. One can reach here as glacial trek through Tawaghat-Bailing-Son—Duktu. Sona glacier and Meola glacier serves the route to climb Panchchuli peaks from east facing direction. Sona glacier is situated north to Meola Glacier. It is situated just below peaks Nagalaphu (6,410 m) and Panchachuli-1 (6,355 m). It is divided into Upper and Lower. The direction of the glacier is south west to north east. It is located on the East to Panchachuli massif.

See also
 List of glaciers

References 

Glaciers of Uttarakhand
Geography of Pithoragarh district